Down by Law is the eponymous debut album of the band Down by Law. Dave Smalley wrote words and music for all tracks except "The Truth" (words and music by Dave Nazworthy), "Surf Punk" (music by Ed Urlik), "The One" (words by Dave S.  and Caroline M.), and "Best Friends" (words and music by The Outlets).

Track listing
All tracks by Dave Smalley

  "Right Or Wrong" – 2:16 
  "Vision" – 2:44
  "Dreams Away" – 3:59 
  "Down The Drain" – 2:37
  "American Dream" – 2:37
  "The Truth" (Dave Nazworthy) – 1:35 
  "Best Friends" (Outlets) – 3:13
  "Mat Gleason Is God" – 4:37 
  "The One" (Caroline Murphy, Smalley) – 3:13
  "Can't See It Still" – 1:42
  "Surf Punk" (Ed Urlik) – 2:06
  "Too Much Grey" – 4:10

Personnel 
Dave Smalley – vocals, guitar 
Dave Naz – drums (vocals on "The Truth") 
Ed Urlik – bass 
Chris Bagarozzi – guitar

External links

https://open.spotify.com/album/1cL6c5nwf2nlU1YNxM2P8f?si=5XYZ--dWQKSZ2lIk8zUpfw
http://www.deezer.com/album/43843811

Down by Law (band) albums
1991 debut albums
Epitaph Records albums